Stephanie Ann Edwards (born November 8, 1943) is an American television personality and actress.

Career
Born in Kenyon, Minnesota, Edwards began her career as an actress, and became widely known as an on-air personality in the 1970s. She co-hosted ABC-TV's AM America, the forerunner to Good Morning America, jointly with Bill Beutel. (She continued with GMA, often substituting for Joan Lunden.) Previously, she had hosted a similar West Coast news and talk program in Southern California, AM Los Angeles along with Ralph Story.

Edwards was nominated in 1979 for a Daytime Emmy Award as Outstanding Host or Hostess in a Talk, Service or Variety Series, for her show Everyday.

She was also the continuing co-host of the Tournament of Roses Parade on Los Angeles television channel KTLA (broadcast widely as a "superstation" across the United States) with former game show host Bob Eubanks from 1978 to 2005, resuming again in 2009. She ended her 35-year career as co-host in 2016.

Tournament of Roses parade
For the 2006 KTLA Rose Parade broadcast, Edwards was replaced after 28 years as Eubanks' co-host in the main booth by KTLA morning news co-anchor Michaela Pereira, and reassigned as an on-street reporter (having to stand outside in the rain while giving periodic live updates). Although all three were equally billed as co-hosts, the move created a storm of controversy, and was seen as insensitive by many of Edwards' fans, as well as by local TV critics.

In 2009, Edwards rejoined Eubanks as co-host of the Tournament of Roses Parade coverage on KTLA. On September 25, 2015, Eubanks revealed that the 2016 parade would be their last.

Edwards was also the longtime commercial spokesperson for the California-based supermarket chain Lucky Stores from the mid-1980s until they merged with Albertsons (1998).

Filmography

Award nominations

References

External links

1943 births
Living people
People from Kenyon, Minnesota
Actresses from Minnesota
American film actresses
American television talk show hosts
American television actresses
21st-century American women